Estadio Municipal de Orcopampa is a multi-use stadium in Orcopampa, Peru. It is currently used mostly for football matches and is the home stadium of Unión Minas (Orcopampa) of the Copa Perú. The stadium holds 5,000 spectators. 

Municipal de Orcopampa
Buildings and structures in Arequipa Region